Posht Tang-e Sofla Rahim Khan (also Romanized as Posht Tang-e Soflá Raḥīm Khān) is a village in Tarhan-e Sharqi Rural District, Tarhan District, Kuhdasht County, Lorestan Province, Iran. At the 2006 census, its population was 126.

References 

Towns and villages in Kuhdasht County